Acuticostites is an extinct genus of cephalopod belonging to the Ammonite subclass.

References

Late Jurassic ammonites
Extinct animals of Russia